William Padley (11 April 1842 – 21 July 1904) was an English cricketer. Padley was a right-handed batsman who bowled right-arm roundarm medium, as well as playing as a wicket-keeper. He was born at Moorgreen, Nottinghamshire.

Padley made a single first-class appearance for Nottinghamshire against Gloucestershire at Trent Bridge in 1876. He ended Nottinghamshire's first-innings of 149 all out unbeaten on 5, while in their second-innings of 97 all out he was dismissed for 10 runs by W. G. Grace. Gloucestershire won what was to be his only appearance in first-class cricket by six wickets.

He died at Bagthorpe, Nottinghamshire on 21 July 1904.

References

External links
William Padley at ESPNcricinfo
William Padley at CricketArchive

1842 births
1904 deaths
People from the Borough of Broxtowe
Cricketers from Nottinghamshire
English cricketers
Nottinghamshire cricketers
Wicket-keepers